Nanda Kishore is an Indian film director and screenwriter who works in Kannada film industry. He is known for directing films like Victory (2013), Adyaksha (2014), and Ranna (2015).

Family
Nanda Kishore is the son of Kannada film actor Sudhir, and Malati. His brother, Tharun Sudhir, is also a film director, in Kannada cinema.

He overcame his obesity problem by losing 76 kg of weight.

Filmography

References

Further reading
A success that didn't come easy

External links

Living people
Kannada film directors
Film directors from Bangalore
Year of birth missing (living people)
21st-century Indian film directors
https://in.bookmyshow.com/person/nanda-kishore/